Gütschow is a German surname. Notable people with the surname include:

 Beate Gütschow (born 1970), German artist
 Torsten Gütschow (born 1962), German footballer and manager

German-language surnames